C5, C05, C V or C-5 may refer to:

Military use 
 Lockheed C-5 Galaxy, a military transport aircraft
 C-5 North Star, a 1940s Canadian military aircraft
 , a 1906 Royal Navy C-class submarine
 , a 1908 United States Navy C-class submarine
 , an 1889 United States Navy protected cruiser
 Albatros C.V, a World War I German military reconnaissance aircraft
 AEG C.V, a World War I prototype German two-seat biplane reconnaissance aircraft
 DFW C.V, a World War I German military reconnaissance aircraft
 Fokker C.V, a 1924 Dutch light reconnaissance and bomber biplane aircraft
 Halberstadt C.V, a World War I German single-engined reconnaissance biplane
 Fokker C-5, an American military version of the Fokker F.VII aircraft
 , a 1915 German Type UC I U-boat
 C-5 (blimp), a United States Navy airship that attempted a trans-Atlantic flight in 1919

Transport, vehicles, roads, public transport routes

Road
 C5 automatic, a successor to Ford C4 transmission
 Chevrolet Corvette C5, the fifth generation of the Chevrolet Corvette sports car
 Citroën C5, a brand of car manufactured by Citroën
 Sauber C5, a sportscar by Sauber
 Audi A6 (C5), the second generation of the Audi A6 built from 1997 to 2004
 Circumferential Road 5 or C-5, an arterial road of Manila, Philippines

Air travel and aircraft vehicles
 Kinner C-5, an American five cylinder radial engine for small aircraft of the 1930s
 Spartan C5, a passenger and utility aircraft produced in the United States in the early 1930s

Rail
 Bavarian C V, an 1899 German express train locomotive model
 WLWR Class C5, a Waterford, Limerick and Western Railway Irish steam locomotive 
 Finnish Steam Locomotive Class C5
 LNER Class C5, a class of British steam locomotives

Other
 Sinclair C5, an electric vehicle designed by Clive Sinclair
 Crown C-5, a series of forklifts by the Crown Equipment Corporation
 Saturn C-5, an American man-rated expendable rocket

Biology 
 Cervical vertebra 5, one of the cervical vertebrae of the vertebral column
 Cervical spinal nerve 5
 Complement component 5, a protein of the complement system
 C5-convertase, an enzyme which splits C5 into C5b
 Complement component 5a, an inflammatory peptide
 ATC code C05 Vasoprotectives, a subgroup of the Anatomical Therapeutic Chemical Classification System
 C05, Malignant neoplasm of palate ICD-10 code

Other uses 
 C5 (classification), a Paralympic cycling classification
 C5 Envelope size
 C5, a decision tree learning algorithm
 C5 Generic Collection Library for C Sharp and CLI, a software library by Niels Kokholm and Peter Sestoft
 C5 line socket, a polarised, three pole, mains voltage IEC appliance connector
 ChorusOS, a computer operating system
 C5, CommutAir IATA code
 C5 or Tenor C, a musical note
 c5, a square of the chessboard using algebraic chess notation
 Microsoft Dynamics C5, enterprise resource planning software
 Channel 5 (disambiguation)
 Nokia C5 (disambiguation), a series of smartphones
 Caldwell 5 (IC 342), an intermediate spiral galaxy in Camelopardalis
 Concrete5, an open source content management system
 A line of earphones from Bowers & Wilkins
 Tha Carter V, a 2018 album by Lil Wayne
 Central 5, an informal political cooperation between Austria, the Czech Republic, Hungary, Slovakia, and Slovenia
 C5, the cycle graph with 5 vertices

See also 
 CV (disambiguation)